Reed Nelson Weisiger (May 2, 1838September 12, 1908) was a Texas State Senator from District 26. Reed Weisiger was often mentioned for Governor of Texas but he declined to run.

Weisiger was Chairman of the Stock and Stock Raising Committee and was on eleven other Senate committees. He served in the Legislature from 1891 to 1893.

Early life and education
Weisiger was born in Danville, Kentucky, May 2, 1838, and attended school there. He completed his education at Centre College, taking a full classical course, and graduated in 1858. He then came to Texas and was a pioneer in Victoria County.

Business, military, and fraternal order
Weisiger was a rancher and farmer and raised thoroughbred horses from the famous Alexander stables of Kentucky. He owned Incommode, which ran in the Kentucky Derby in 1887.

Weisiger served as a cavalry officer in the Confederate States Army during the American Civil War. At the end of the war, he held the rank of captain.

Weisiger was a member of the Masonic Lodge and held the degree of Master Mason.

Family

Weisiger's father was Dr. Joseph Weisiger. His mother was Isabella Reed Weisiger a descendant of a Virginia family related to the Clays and Adamses. Weisiger married Annie Belle Callender on June 24, 1874. Weisiger and his wife had eight children: Robert Sidney Weisiger, Roper C. Weisiger, Joseph Reed Weisiger, Isabella Weisiger Mackrell, Lucy R. Weisiger, Sarah Weisiger, William Hardeman Weisiger, and Grayson Carter Weisiger.

See also
Daniel Weisiger Adams

References

1838 births
1908 deaths
Politicians from Danville, Kentucky
Texas state senators
Confederate States Army officers
People of Texas in the American Civil War
Centre College alumni
People from Victoria County, Texas
19th-century American politicians
Military personnel from Texas